Cyperus limiticola is a species of sedge that is native to central parts of Madagascar.

See also 
 List of Cyperus species

References 

limiticola
Plants described in 2008
Endemic flora of Madagascar